Société Air Alsace was an airline with its head office on the grounds of the Colmar-Houssen Aerodrome in Colmar, France.

History

Air Alsace began as an air taxi operation based in Colmar in 1962.  It commenced operations using small aircraft. From 1974 it began to operate scheduled passenger regional services and on 1 January 1975 merged with Air Vosges and its fleet of Cessna 401 and Cessna 402.

In cooperation with Air France it offered services to Amsterdam, Brussels, Cologne, Rome and Strasbourg.  Flights to London Gatwick and Milan were later added.  Air Alsace entered the jet age in April 1976 with the delivery of their first VFW 614 and it later acquired the Aerospatiale Corvette and the Fokker F.28 Fellowship. In 1981 the airline merged with TAT - Touraine Air Transport and Air Alpes to form TAT-Transport Aerien Transregional.

Fleet 

 Aérospatiale Corvette
 Cessna
 Piper Navajo (Air Alsace initially commenced services with two of these twin engine piston aircraft)
 Nord 262
 Fokker F.27 Friendship
 VFW 614
 Fokker F.28 Fellowship

References

 

			 

Defunct airlines of France
Airlines established in 1962
Airlines disestablished in 1981